Amasio Valence (born 12 May 1979) is a former rugby sevens player. He was born in Nadi, Fiji, but after he first made his break into professional rugby in 2000, he switched allegiances to New Zealand. He was hailed as one of the most promising players in the discipline in recent years. Valence is the only New Zealander to have won three gold medals in rugby sevens at the Commonwealth Games; in 1998, 2002 and 2006, a testament to his longevity in the game. He last played for New Zealand in 2008.

While Valence played rugby, his entire family enjoyed soccer, with his older brother, Nikola Raoma being picked for the national side of Fiji in 2002.

References
 Interview on Urbanwire

External links 
 

1979 births
Living people
Fijian rugby union players
Rugby union fly-halves
Commonwealth Games gold medallists for New Zealand
Rugby sevens players at the 1998 Commonwealth Games
Rugby sevens players at the 2002 Commonwealth Games
Rugby sevens players at the 2006 Commonwealth Games
Commonwealth Games rugby sevens players of New Zealand
New Zealand international rugby sevens players
Fijian emigrants to New Zealand
I-Taukei Fijian people
Fijian expatriates in New Zealand
Sportspeople from Nadi
Commonwealth Games medallists in rugby sevens
New Zealand male rugby sevens players
Medallists at the 1998 Commonwealth Games
Medallists at the 2002 Commonwealth Games
Medallists at the 2006 Commonwealth Games